Dahl Lake Provincial Park is a provincial park in British Columbia, Canada. It was established on October 22, 1981, and is currently 1,583 ha in size.

References

External links
 BC Parks

Provincial parks of British Columbia